Stadler is a German surname. Notable people with the surname include:

Andreas Stadler (weightlifter) (1896–1941), Austrian weightlifter
Andreas Stadler (born 1965), Austrian diplomat and political scientist
Andrew Stadler (born 1988), American football (soccer) player
Anton Stadler (1753–1812), Austrian clarinet and basset horn player
Arnold Stadler (born 1954), German writer
Charles A. Stadler (1848–1928), American politician
Clarissa Stadler (born 1966),  Austrian journalist, moderator and writer
Craig Stadler (born 1953), American golfer
Ernst Stadler (1883–1914), German poet
Ewald Stadler (born 1961), Austrian politician
Friedrich Stadler (born 1951), Austrian historian
Gary Stadler, American new-age pianist
Hermann Stadler (born 1961), Austrian football (soccer) player
Joachim Stadler (born 1970), German football (soccer) player
Joerg Stadler (born 1961), German actor
Johann Rudolf Stadler (1605–1637), Swiss clock-maker
Johann Stadler (1755–1804), Austrian clarinet and basset horn player
Joseph Stadler (1880–1950), American athlete
Josip Stadler (1843–1918), Croatian priest
Kevin Stadler (born 1980), American golfer
Lewis Stadler (1896–1954), American geneticist
Normann Stadler (born 1973), German triathlete
Matthew Stadler (born 1959), American writer
Maximilian Stadler (1748–1833), Austrian composer
Monika Stadler (born 1963), Austrian harpist
René Stadler (born 1940), Swiss bobsledder
Roland Stadler (born 1959), Swiss tennis player
Rupert Stadler (born 1963), German businessman
Simon Stadler (born 1983), German tennis player
Svenja Stadler (born 1979), German politician
Sylvester Stadler (1910–1995), Austrian military

German toponymic surnames
Surnames of Austrian origin